Giancarlo Bulgheroni (6 June 1928 – 28 February 1971) was an Italian ice hockey player. He competed in the men's tournament at the 1948 Winter Olympics.

References

1928 births
1971 deaths
Ice hockey players at the 1948 Winter Olympics
Ice hockey people from Milan
Olympic ice hockey players of Italy